Bleach: The Blade of Fate is a 2D fighting game that features the cast of characters from the Bleach anime and manga. The game features Nintendo's Wi-Fi Connection, allowing players to connect and play against players all over the world. The game modes include story mode, arcade mode, VS mode, training mode, challenge mode, and survival mode, time attack mode and Urahara shop. The game's theme song is "Ichirin no Hana" by High and Mighty Color.

Plot
Bleach: The Blade of Fate follows Ichigo Kurosaki on his quest to save a Soul Reaper named Rukia Kuchiki, who is scheduled for execution for giving Ichigo her Soul Reaper powers so he could save his family from a Hollow. The story modes for each character vary and an additional 22 episodes can be unlocked upon completing the new unlocked episodes after Rescue Rukia. A 23rd episode more accurately details the Soul Society arc beginning with Ichigo's fight against Ganju Shiba and ending with Sōsuke Aizen's betrayal.

Gameplay
Battles in Bleach are between two and four characters in any combination of teams and enemies. Both ally and enemy characters can either be AI-controlled, or controlled by other players via Nintendo WFC or DS Wireless Communications. Like Treasure's earlier anime fighting game, Yū Yū Hakusho Makyō Tōitsusen, the game features two planes that players can jump between, accommodating up to four players. The fighting in Bleach is controlled through a combination of the D-pad, the A, X, B and Y buttons and the touch screen. The D-pad is used for moving the character, the A, X, Y and B buttons are used to attack using a light, medium or heavy attack or initiate a flash step and the touch screen is used to initiate special attacks, RF moves and use special status affecting cards.

The gameplay in The Blade of Fate remains mostly unchanged from the Japanese version apart from several fixed balance issues. The most notable addition is an "anti-air" system; attacks coming from the ground cannot be blocked in the air, which alters the gameplay significantly. It allows attack opportunities and traps not possible in the original game.

Reception

The game received "favorable" reviews according to video game review aggregator Metacritic.  In Japan, Famitsu gave it a score of three eights and one seven for a total of 31 out of 40, while Famitsu Cube + Advance gave it a score of two eights and two sevens for a total of 30 out of 40.

The game was also awarded Best Fighting Game of 2007 by IGN.

See also
 Bleach
 Bleach: Dark Souls
 List of Bleach video games
 List of Nintendo DS games

Notes

References

External links
Official Bleach DS: Souten ni Kakeru Unmei website

2006 video games
Blade of Fate, The
Nintendo DS games
Nintendo DS-only games
Sega video games
Treasure (company) games
Fighting games
Multiplayer and single-player video games
Video games developed in Japan